This is a list of settlements in the Xanthi regional unit, Greece.

 Abdera
 Avato
 Dafnonas
 Diomideia
 Echinos
 Erasmio
 Evlalo
 Evmoiro
 Exochi
 Galani
 Genisea
 Gerakas
 Karyofyto
 Kimmeria
 Komnina
 Kotyli
 Koutso
 Krousa
 Livas
 Magiko
 Mandra
 Mangana
 Myki
 Myrodato
 Nea Kessani
 Neochori
 Olvio
 Oraio 
 Paschalia
 Pigadia
 Polysitos
 Satres
 Selero 
 Selino
 Sounio
 Stavroupoli
 Thermes 
 Toxotes 
 Xanthi

By municipality

See also
List of towns and villages in Greece
Slavic toponyms of places in Xanthi Prefecture

 
Xanthi